The 1955 Major League Baseball All-Star Game was the 22nd playing of the midsummer classic between the all-stars of the American League (AL) and National League (NL), the two leagues comprising Major League Baseball. The game was held on July 12, 1955, at Milwaukee County Stadium, the home of the Milwaukee Braves of the National League.

Summary
The National League overcame a five-run deficit to defeat the American League, 6–5, in this edition of the midsummer classic. Stan Musial led off the bottom of the 12th inning by drilling a home run to deep right field on the first pitch from Frank Sullivan, pulling off one of the greatest victories in All-Star Game history.

The National League began their comeback in the bottom of the seventh inning. Willie Mays led off the frame with a single off Whitey Ford, and after two outs, Hank Aaron walked and Johnny Logan singled to drive home Mays and make it a 5–1 game. Next batter Stan Lopata reached base on an error, and Aaron scored the second run off the inning before the third out was made.

With two outs in the eight inning, Mays, Ted Kluszewski and Randy Jackson hit consecutive singles for a run, and Ford was replaced by Sullivan. Aaron greeted him with an RBI single scoring Kluszewski to knot the game at 5–5.

The American League quickly took the lead in the top of the first inning when Harvey Kuenn and Nellie Fox hit consecutive singles against Robin Roberts, with Kuenn advancing to third base from first and later scoring on a wild pitch. Then Ted Williams walked and Mickey Mantle hit a three-run home run, before Roberts recorded his first out. In the sixth inning, Mickey Vernon grounded out to drive home Yogi Berra to give the American League a five-run cushion.

In the ninth inning, Joe Nuxhall and Sullivan matched strikeouts as the All-Star Game went into extra innings for only the second time since 1950, which turned out to be the first year the game went more than nine innings.

The contest remained tied until the 12th inning, when Gene Conley struck out all three AL batters he faced. Then came the walk-off by Musial, which was his fourth homer in All-Star games, breaking a tie with Ted Williams and Ralph Kiner.

It was the fifth victory for the National League in the last six All-Star games, even though the American League still held a 13–9 overall advantage.

Notes
 Billy Pierce sailed through his three innings of work for the American League, facing the minimum nine batters while striking out three without walks. Red Schoendienst led off the first inning with a single, but was out trying to advance to second on a pitch in the dirt that Yogi Berra managed to smother.
 Early Wynn relieved Pierce in the fourth, and he tossed three shutout innings as well, allowing just three hits.
 Harvey Haddix took over for Roberts in the fourth and he went three innings, allowing just one run in the sixth.
 Don Newcombe (1), Sam Jones and Joe Nuxhall combined for five scoreless innings.
 Whitey Ford got the first two batters out in the eighth, but allowed three singles and a run and was replaced by Frank Sullivan, who faced 14 batters in  innings before the Musial's blast.
 It was the only All-Star appearance for Sullivan, the losing pitcher, who would win 18 games for the Boston Red Sox that season. In 1960, Sullivan would be traded for the winning pitcher in this game, Gene Conley.
 Both teams' pitchers combined for 23 hits and 20 strikeouts of 100 batters faced.
 Roy Campanella was selected for the National League roster in the poll, but he did not play in the game due to a leg injury and was replaced by Stan Lopata.
 Ironically, this game was played the same day on which funeral services were held for Arch Ward, the sports editor for the Chicago Tribune, who had founded the All-Star Game in 1933.

Opening Lineups

Rosters
Players in italics have since been inducted into the National Baseball Hall of Fame.

Umpires

Line Score

Winning Run scored with 0 outs

Play-by-play at Retrosheet

References

External links
Baseball Almanac
Baseball Reference
IMDb.com

Major League Baseball All-Star Game
Major League Baseball All-Star Game
Major League Baseball All Star Game
July 1955 sports events in the United States
Baseball competitions in Milwaukee
1950s in Milwaukee